From Nothing to One, released in 2002, is the debut album by Swedish indie rock band The Perishers.

Track listing
"When I Wake Up Tomorrow" – 3:12
"In the Blink of an Eye" – 4:05
"Someday" – 3:52
"When I Fall" – 3:09
"The Night – 4:42
"Steady Red Light" – 3:35
"My Home Town" – 4:12
"Let's Write Something Down" – 4:01
"On My Way Home" – 3:59
"All Over Now" – 3:30
"What We Once Had" – 5:28

References

2002 albums
The Perishers (band) albums